Dr. Rita Hocog Inos Jr./Sr. High School (RHI), formerly Rota Jr./Sr. High School, is a secondary school in Songsong on the island of Rota in the Northern Mariana Islands, and a part of the CNMI Public School System. It is the island's sole secondary school.

The mascot is the Buck.

History
Rota Jr./Sr. High School was formed in 2006 by the consolidation of Rota High School and Rota Junior High School.

Rota Elementary/Junior & High School previously served Rota. Rota High School separated from the K-12 school, and had its first class graduate in June 1974 and in 1983 moved from the former Rota Elementary School facility to a new facility.

References

External links
 Dr. Rita Hocog Inos Jr./Sr. High School profile at the CNMI Public School System
 

Public high schools in the United States
Public middle schools in the United States
Schools in the Northern Mariana Islands
High schools in the Northern Mariana Islands
Educational institutions established in 2006
2006 establishments in the Northern Mariana Islands